Casearia megacarpa is a species of flowering plant in the family Salicaceae. It is endemic to Colombia.

References

External links

megacarpa
Vulnerable plants
Endemic flora of Colombia
Taxonomy articles created by Polbot